Mirza Mohammad may refer to:
Mirza Mohammed, Guantanamo detainee
Mirza Mohammad (Shah) (1749–1750), King of Persia
Mírzá Muhammad ʻAlí, one of the sons of Bahá'u'lláh, the founder of the Bahá'í Faith